Clostridium intestinale is a bacterium from the genus Clostridium which has been isolated from faeces of a cattle in Japan. Clostridium intestinale can cause bacteremia.

References

 

Bacteria described in 1989
intestinale